This is a list of historical Indian reservations in the United States.  These Indian and Half-breed Reservations and Reserves were either disestablished or revoked. Few still exist as a considerably smaller remnant, or have been merged with other Indian Reservations, or recognised by state governments (such as Oklahoma Tribal Statistical Area also known as OTSA) but not by the US federal government.


Historical American Indian reservations

A

 Amaknak Island Reserve (Alaska)—revoked by Alaska Native Claims Settlement Act
 Arikarees, Gros Ventre and Mandan Indian Reservation (North Dakota/Montana)—smaller remnant exists as part of Fort Berthold Indian Reservation (North Dakota)
 Ashkum Indian Reservation (Indiana)—disestablished
 Au Foin River Indian Reserves (Michigan)—disestablished
 Au Sable River Indian Reserve (Michigan)—former 8,000 acre Reserve of the Saginaw Chippewa Tribal Nation; disestablished
 Aubbeenaubbee Indian Reservation (Indiana)—disestablished
 Auglaize Indian Reserve (Ohio)—disestablished
 Awn-kote Indian Reservation (Illinois)—disestablished

B

 Beaubien Indian Reserves (Michigan)—disestablished
 Bertrand Indian Reserves (Michigan)—disestablished
 Big Rock Indian Reserve (Michigan)—former 10,000 acre Reserve of the Saginaw Chippewa Tribal Nation; disestablished
 Big Spring Reserve (Ohio)—disestablished
 Black Bird Indian Community (Michigan)—former 6,000 acre Reserve of the Saginaw Chippewa Tribal Nation; disestablished
 Black Loon Indian Reservation (Indiana)—disestablished
 Blanchard's Fork Reserve (Ohio)—disestablished
 Brotherton Indian Reservation (New Jersey)
 Bourbonné Indian Reserve (Illinois)—disestablished
 Buffalo Creek Reservation (New York)—disestablished

C
 
 Cayuga Cattaraugus Indian Reservation (NY) disestablished 1964 but recognized land claims 1995-2008 supreme court USA
 Caddo-Wichita-Delaware Indian Reservation (OK)—disestablished but recognized as the Caddo-Wichita-Delaware OTSA
 Caldwell Indian Reserve (IL)—disestablished
 Cass Lake Indian Reservation (MN)—merged with Leech Lake Indian Reservation
 Chandler Indian Reserve (MI)—disestablished
 Charley Indian Reservation (IN)—disestablished
 Chechaukkose Indian Reservation (IN)—disestablished
 Cherokee Indian Reservation (KS)—disestablished
 Cherokee Indian Reservation (OK)—disestablished but recognized as the Cherokee OTSA
 Cheyenne-Arapaho Indian Reservation (OK)—disestablished but recognized as the Cheyenne-Arapaho OTSA
 Chickasaw Indian Reservation (OK)—disestablished but recognized as the Chickasaw OTSA
 Chilkat Fisheries Reserve (AK)—revoked by Alaska Native Claims Settlement Act
 Chinquaqua Indian Reservation (IN)—disestablished
 Chippewa Indian Reservation (KS)—disestablished
 Chippewa Indian Reservation (MN)—merged with Leech Lake Indian Reservation
 Choctaw Indian Reservation (OK)—disestablished but recognized as the Choctaw OTSA
 Chopine Indian Reservation (Allen County, IN)—disestablished
 Chopine Indian Reservation (Whitley County, IN)—disestablished
 Citizen Potawatomi Nation-Absentee Shawnee Indian Reservation (OK)—disestablished but recognized as the Citizen Potawatomi Nation-Absentee Shawnee OTSA
 Coastal Indian Reservation (OR)—smaller remnant exists as the Siletz Indian Reservation
 Creek Indian Reservation (OK)—disestablished but recognized as the Creek OTSA

D

 Delaware Indian Reservation (KS)—disestablished
 Des Moines Half-Breed Reservation (IA)—disestablished

E

 Eastern Shawnee Indian Reservation (OK)—disestablished but recognized as the Eastern Shawnee OTSA
 Elim Reserve (AK)—revoked by Alaska Native Claims Settlement Act
 Elkhart Indian Reserves (IN)—disestablished

F

 Fairplain Indian Reserves (MI)—disestablished
 Flat Belly Indian Reservation (IN)—disestablished
 Flint River Indian Reserve (MI)—a.k.a. Pewonigowink Reserve, 5,760 acre Reserve of the Saginaw Chippewa Tribal Nation; disestablished

G

 Godfroy Reserve (IN)—disestablished
 Great Sioux Reservation (ND/SD/NE)—smaller remnants exist as, or as part of, the Cheyenne River Indian Reservation, Lower Brule Indian Reservation, Pine Ridge Indian Reservation, Standing Rock Indian Reservation and Upper Brulé Indian Reservation (which its smaller remnant exists as the Rosebud Indian Reservation).
 Gros Ventre, Piegan Blood, Blackfeet and River Crow Indian Reservation (MT)—smaller remnants exist as the Blackfeet Indian Reservation, Fort Belknap Indian Reservation and Fort Peck Indian Reservation, with Rocky Boy's Indian Reservation established in within the former Indian Reservation boundaries, in addition to scattered parcels of the Turtle Mountain Indian Reservation.
 Gull Lake Indian Reservation (MN)—disestablished

H

 Hog Creek Reserve (OH)—disestablished
 Hole in the Days Indian Reservation (MN)—disestablished

I

 Île-à-l'Ail Indian Reservation (IN)—a.k.a. Bondie Reserve; disestablished
 Iowa Indian Reservation (OK)—disestablished but recognized as the Iowa OTSA

J
 Juaneño Indian Rancheria (CA) - disestablished, the Juaneno Band of Mission Indians claim the former Marine Corps Air Station El Toro was their historical Indian Reservation.

K

 Kansa Indian Reservation (KS)—disestablished
 Karluk Fishing Reserve (AK)—revoked by Alaska Native Claims Settlement Act
 Kaw Indian Reservation (OK)—disestablished but recognized as the Kaw OTSA
 Kawkawlin Indian Reserve (MI)—6,000 acre Reserve of the Saginaw Chippewa Tribal Nation; disestablished
 Keokuk's Reserve (IA)—disestablished
 Ketchewaundaugenick Indian Reserve (MI)—a.k.a. Big Lick Reserve, 3,000 acre Reserve of the Saginaw Chippewa Tribal Nation; disestablished
 Kewanna Indian Reservation (IN)—disestablished
 Kickapoo Indian Reservation (OK)—disestablished but recognized as the Kickapoo OTSA
 Kiowa-Comanche-Apache-Fort Sill Apache Indian Reservation (OK)—disestablished but recognized as the Kiowa-Comanche-Apache-Fort Sill Apache OTSA
 Klukwan Reservation (AK)—revoked by Alaska Native Claims Settlement Act

L

 LaFramboise Reserve (IL)—disestablished
 LaFramboise Reserve (IN)—disestablished
 Lake Pepin Half-Breed Reservation (MN)—disestablished
 Lake Winnibigoshish Indian Reservation (MN)—merged with Leech Lake Indian Reservation
 LeClerc Reserve (IL)—disestablished
 Lewistown Reserve (OH)—disestablished
 Little Forks Indian Reserve (MI)—6,000 acre Reserve of the Saginaw Chippewa Tribal Nation; disestablished

M

 Machesaw Indian Reservation (IN)—disestablished
 Malheur Indian Reservation (OR)—disestablished
 Mazaqua Indian Reservation (IN)—disestablished
 Me-naw-che Indian Reserve (MI)—disestablished
 Memotway Indian Reservation (IN)—disestablished
 Menominee Indian Reservation (IN)—disestablished
 Menoequet Indian Community (MI)—1,000 acre Reserve of the Saginaw Chippewa Tribal Nation; disestablished 
 Meshingomeshia Indian Reservation (IN)—disestablished
 Mesquabuck Indian Reservation (IN)—disestablished
 Metlakatla Indian Reserve (AK)—smaller remnant exists as the Annette Island Reserve
 Metosanyah Indian Reservation (IN)—disestablished
 Miami Indian Reservation (KS)—disestablished
 Miami Indian Reservation (OK)—disestablished but recognized as the Miami OTSA
 Minemaung Reserve (IL)—disestablished
 Miranda Reserve (IL)—disestablished
 Mo-ah-way Reserve (IL)—disestablished
 Modoc Indian Reservation (OK)—disestablished but recognized as the Modoc OTSA
 Monguago Indian Reserve (MI)—disestablished
Monoquet Indian Community (IN)—disestablished
 Moose Dungs Indian Reservation (MN)—disestablished
 Mota Indian Reservation (IN)—disestablished
 Mukkose Indian Reservation (IN)—disestablished

N

 Na-au-say Reserve (IL)—a.k.a. Waish-kee-shaw Reserve; disestablished
 Nabobask Indian Reserve (MI)—a.k.a. Nanabish or Nebobish Reserve, 2,000 acre Reserve of the Saginaw Chippewa Tribal Nation; disestablished
 Naswawkee Indian Reservation (IN)—disestablished
 Neahlongqua Indian Reservation (IN)—disestablished
 Nemaha Half-Breed Reservation (NE)—disestablished
 New York Indian Reservation (KS)—disestablished
 Neutrals Indian Reservation (KS)—disestablished
 Niobrara Indian Reservation (NE)—smaller remnant exists as the Santee Sioux Indian Reservation
 North Maumee River Reserve (OH)—disestablished
Nottoway Indian Reservation (VA)—disestablished

O

 Ogallala Sioux Indian Reservation (SD/NE)—smaller remnant exists as the Pine Ridge Indian Reservation (SD)
 Ogee Reserve (IL)—disestablished
 Okawmause Indian Reservation (IN)—disestablished
 Osage Indian Reservation (KS)—disestablished
 Otoe Indian Reservation (KS/NE)—disestablished
 Otoe-Missouria Indian Reservation (OK)—disestablished but recognized as the Otoe-Missouria OTSA
 Ottawa Indian Reservation (OK)—disestablished but recognized as the Ottawa OTSA
 Ottawas of Blanchard's Fork Indian Reservation (KS)—disestablished
 Ottawas of Roche de Boeuf and Wolf Rapids Indian Reservation (KS)—disestablished
 Otusson Indian Community (MI)—8,000 acre Reserve of the Saginaw Chippewa Tribal Nation; disestablished
 Ouilmette Reserve (IL)—disestablished

P

 Pankishaw and Wia Indian Reservation (KS)—disestablished
 Pawnee Indian Reservation (NE)—disestablished
 Pawnee Indian Reservation (OK)—disestablished but recognized as the Pawnee OTSA
 Paw Paw Grove Reserve (IL)—a.k.a. As-sim-in-eh-kon Reserve; disestablished
 Peoria and Kaskaskia Indian Reservation (KS)—disestablished
 Peoria Indian Reservation (OK)—disestablished but recognized as the Peoria OTSA
 Point Au Gres Indian Reserve (MI)—2,000 acre Reserve of the Saginaw Chippewa Tribal Nation; disestablished
 Pokegama Lake Indian Reservation (MN)—disestablished; was located along the Mississippi River near Grand Rapids, MN
 Pokegama Lake Indian Settlement (MN)—merged with Mille Lacs Indian Reservation; located by the Snake River near Pine City, MN
 Ponca Indian Reservation (SD/NE)—disestablished. A new reservation Ponca Indian Reservation (NE) re-established, within the original exterior boundaries of the Ponca Indian Reservation (SD/NE) but exterior of the smaller remnant of it before its disestablishment.
 Ponca Indian Reservation (OK)—disestablished but recognized as the Ponca OTSA
 Portsmouth Indian Reserve (MI)—640 acre Reserve of the Saginaw Chippewa Tribal Nation located at the Great Bend of the Cass River; disestablished
 Potawatomi Indian Reservation (KS)—smaller remnant exists as the Prairie Band Potawatomi Indian Reservation
 Pothier Reserve (IL)—disestablished

Q

 Quapaw Indian Reservation (OK)—disestablished but recognized as the Quapaw OTSA

R

 Rabbit Lake Indian Reservation (MN)—disestablished
 Rifle River Indian Reserve (MI)—a.k.a. Mishowusk Reserve, 2,000 acre Reserve of the Saginaw Chippewa Tribal Nation; disestablished
 Robinson Reserve (IL)—disestablished
 Roche de Bœuf Reserve (OH)—disestablished

S

 Sac and Fox Indian Reservation (NE)—disestablished; not to be confused with the nearby Sac and Fox Indian Reservation (KS/NE)
 Sac and Fox Indian Reservation (OK)—disestablished but recognized as the Sac and Fox OTSA
 Saginaw Bay Indian Reservation (MI)—40,000 acre Reserve of the Saginaw Chippewa Tribal Nation, smaller remnant now exists as part of the Isabella Indian Reservation (MI)
 Saginaw River Indian Reserve (MI)—1,000 acre Reserve of the Saginaw Chippewa Tribal Nation; disestablished
 Sebastian Indian Reservation (CA)—established in 1853; disestablished
 Seminole Indian Reservation (OK)—disestablished but recognized as the Seminole OTSA
 Seneca-Cayuga Indian Reservation (OK)—disestablished but recognized as the Seneca-Cayuga OTSA
 Seneca Reserve (OH)—disestablished
 Shab-eh-ney Reserve (IL)—disestablished
 Shawwawnassee Reserve (IL)—disestablished
 South Maumee River Reserve (OH)—disestablished
 Stony Island Indian Reserve (MI)—a.k.a. Shaingwaukokaug Reserve, approximately 1,000 acre Reserve of the Saginaw Chippewa Tribal Nation; disestablished

T

 Table Rock Indian Reservation (OR)—disestablished
 Tetlin Reserve (AK)—revoked by Alaska Native Claims Settlement Act
 Tonkawa Indian Reservation (OK)—disestablished but recognized as the Tonkawa OTSA
 Topeah Indian Reservation (IN)—disestablished

U

Upper Brulé Indian Reservation (SD/NE)—smaller remnant exists as the Rosebud Indian Reservation (SD)

V

 Venetie Reserve (AK)—revoked by Alaska Native Claims Settlement Act

W

 Wapakoneta Reserve (OH)—disestablished
 Wapasepah Indian Reservation (IN)—disestablished
 Wau-pon-eh-see Indian Reservation (IL)—disestablished
 Wesaw Indian Reservation (IN)—disestablished
 White Oak Point Indian Reservation (MN)—merged with Leech Lake Indian Reservation
 Wolf Rapids Reserve (OH)—disestablished
 Wyandotte Indian Reservation (OK)—disestablished but recognized as the Wyandotte OTSA
 Wyandott Reservation (OH)—disestablished

X

Y

Z

See also
 Federally recognized tribes
 (Federally) unrecognized tribes
 Native Americans in the United States
 List of Alaska Native tribal entities
 List of Indian reservations in the United States
 National Park Service Native American Heritage Sites
 Outline of United States federal Indian law and policy
 State recognized tribes in the United States

References

 
-
Native American-related lists